The Women's 200 metre freestyle competition at the 2017 World Championships was held on 25 and 26 July 2017.

Records
Prior to the competition, the existing world and championship records were as follows.

Results

Heats
The heats were held on 25 July at 09:49.

Semifinals
The semifinal were held on 25 July at 18:44.

Semifinal 1

Semifinal 2

Final
The final was held on 26 July at 17:32.

References

Women's 200 metre freestyle
2017 in women's swimming